Puerto Rico Highway 129 (PR-129) is a north–south (actually diagonal) highway in North-Central Puerto Rico, connecting the town of Lares with Arecibo. It crosses the northern karst country of the island. When traveling from the northern coast of Puerto Rico, PR-129 can be used to reach the Arecibo Observatory and the Camuy River Caverns Park.

Route description
It is a four-lane, divided highway in Arecibo, and a super two highway in Hatillo, Camuy and Lares. It then merges with PR-111, being entirely unsigned throughout this section. It then heads south as a narrow, rural road, and ends at PR-135 near Adjuntas. Its speed limit is overall  through its highway section. It was originally a narrow, two lane road. Much of the original alignment is now PR-134.

Major intersections

See also

 List of highways numbered 129

References

External links
 

129